Bhishma, also known as Bhishma Pratigna is a 1936 Indian Hindu mythological film directed by P. Y. Altekar. It is based on the character of the same name from the Indian epic Mahabharata.

Plot 
Shanthanu Maharaja is in love with the river goddess Ganga who drowns their seven daughters at birth. Their eighth child is Bhishma. To please his father and keep his promise to his mother, Bhishma vows not to marry.

Cast 
 M. S. Damodara Rao as Shanthanu Maharaja
 Kanthimathi Bai as Ganga
 T. S. Jaya as Sathyavathi

Production 
Bhishma is the first Tamil film to be based on the character of the same name from the Indian epic Mahabharata. It was directed by P. Y. Altekar, and produced by Salem Films. The film had an alternate title, Bhishma Pratigna. Shooting took place at the Calcutta-based East India Film Studios.

Soundtrack 
No known information on the film's music composer and lyricist remain, although film historian Randor Guy believes both were done by Papanasam Sivan. There were as many as 23 songs, with one consisting of Hindi words such as acchha (good), kushi (happiness) and besh besh.

Release and reception 
According to Randor Guy, the film was a reasonable success "mainly because of the familiar story and songs".

References

External links 
 

1930s Tamil-language films
1936 films
Films based on the Mahabharata
Hindu mythological films
Indian black-and-white films